Klingenberg is a municipality in the Sächsische Schweiz-Osterzgebirge district, in Saxony, Germany. It was formed on 31 December 2012 by the merger of the former municipalities Pretzschendorf and Höckendorf.

Geography
The municipality is located 20 kilometers south-west of Dresden and 10 kilometers west of Dippoldiswalde.

Klingenberg consists of 11 subdivisions: Beerwalde, Borlas, Colmnitz (including Folge), Friedersdorf, Höckendorf (including Edle Krone), Klingenberg, Obercunnersdorf, Paulshain, Pretzschendorf, Röthenbach and Ruppendorf.

Transport
Klingenberg is located along Dresden–Werdau railway, having two stations within its limits: Klingenberg-Colmnitz (located in the boroughs of Klingenberg and Colmnitz) and Edle Krone (located in the village of Höckendorf). At Klingenberg-Colmnitz station two narrow-gauge railway lines used to branch off until the early 1970s, connecting also the villages of Colmnitz and Pretzschendorf to the rail network.

References